Luis Andújar Sanchez (born November 22, 1972) is a former right-handed pitcher in Major League Baseball and the Korea Baseball Organization.

Andújar signed with the Chicago White Sox as an amateur free agent at age 18 and made his profession debut with that organisation. He was later traded to the Toronto Blue Jays, where he ended his major league career. Over his career Andújar made 20 starts and 15 relief appearances, and compiled a 3 -10 won-loss record. He later played one season with the Haitai Tigers of the KBO in 2001.

External links

Career statistics and player information from Korea Baseball Organization

1972 births
Living people
Allentown Ambassadors players
Birmingham Barons players
Calgary Cannons players
Charlotte Knights players
Chicago White Sox players
Dominican Republic expatriate baseball players in Canada
Dominican Republic expatriate baseball players in the United States
Dominican Republic expatriate baseball players in South Korea
Gulf Coast White Sox players
Haitai Tigers players
Las Vegas Stars (baseball) players

Long Island Ducks players
Major League Baseball pitchers
Major League Baseball players from the Dominican Republic
Nashua Pride players
Nashville Sounds players
People from Baní
Sarasota White Sox players
South Bend White Sox players
Syracuse Chiefs players
Syracuse SkyChiefs players
Toronto Blue Jays players